Ikageng may refer to:
Ikageng, Mpumalanga
Ikageng, North West